This is the Recorded Music NZ list of number-one singles in New Zealand during the 2020s decade, starting from Monday 6 January 2020. The chart also includes data from on-demand audio streaming services.

Justin Bieber has achieved five number one singles this decade, the most of any artist thus far.  

From the 2020's L.A.B.'s "In the Air" was the top song of 2020, Glass Animals "Heat Waves" was the top song of 2021 which peaked at No.2 and Elton John and Dua Lipa's "Cold Heart (Pnau remix)" was the top song of 2022

Chart
Key
 – Number-one single of the year
 – Song of New Zealand origin
 – Number-one single of the year, of New Zealand origin

Notes

References

Number-one singles
New Zealand Singles
2020